Alast-e Sofla (also Romanized as Alast-e Soflá; also known as Alast-e Pā’īn and Alast Pā’īn) is a village in Safiabad Rural District, Bam and Safiabad District, Esfarayen County, North Khorasan Province, Iran. At the 2006 census, its population was 448, in 116 families.

References 

Populated places in Esfarayen County